Battle Run is a  long 1st order tributary to Little Wheeling Creek in Ohio County, West Virginia.

Course 
Battle Run rises about 1.5 miles east-southeast of Clinton, West Virginia, in Ohio County and then flows south-southeast to join Little Wheeling Creek at Point Mills, West Virginia.

Watershed 
Battle Run drains  of area, receives about 40.9 in/year of precipitation, has a wetness index of 292.99, and is about 63% forested.

See also 
 List of rivers of West Virginia

References 

Rivers of Ohio County, West Virginia
Rivers of West Virginia